The Tai Yuen Hi-Tech Industrial Park is an industrial park in Zhubei City, Hsinchu County, Taiwan.

History
The industrial park was opened in July 2001.

Transportation
The industrial park is accessible within walking distance east of Zhubei Station of Taiwan Railways.

See also
 Hsinchu Science and Industrial Park

References

External links

 

2001 establishments in Taiwan
Buildings and structures in Hsinchu County
Industrial parks in Taiwan